Fenghuang Xincun Station is a station on Line 8 of the Guangzhou Metro. The underground station is located on Gongye Avenue North in the Haizhu District. The station opened on November3, 2010 after a delay caused by the cooling tower at Shayuan Station. It was the terminus of the line until December 28, 2019 when the line was extended to Cultural Park station.

Station layout

Exits

References

Railway stations in China opened in 2010
Guangzhou Metro stations in Haizhu District